Joseph Paletta Jr. (born November 15, 1937) is an American fencer. He competed in the individual and team foil events at the 1960 Summer Olympics.

References

External links
 

1937 births
Living people
American male foil fencers
Olympic fencers of the United States
Fencers at the 1960 Summer Olympics
Sportspeople from New York (state)
Pan American Games medalists in fencing
Pan American Games gold medalists for the United States
Pan American Games bronze medalists for the United States
Fencers at the 1959 Pan American Games